Cherves-Richemont is a commune in the Charente department in southwestern France. It was formed by the merger of Cherves-de-Cognac (before 1956: Cherves) with Richemont in January 1973.

Population

See also
Communes of the Charente department

References

Communes of Charente
Charente communes articles needing translation from French Wikipedia